The Wadi Radd is a tributary of the Khabur River in Syria.  Halaba lies near its bank.

References

Radd
Tributaries of the Khabur (Euphrates)